Peter Karl Jehle (born 22 January 1982) is a Liechtensteiner retired footballer who played as a goalkeeper.

He spent most of his career with Vaduz, representing the club in both the Swiss Super League and the Challenge League. He also competed professionally in France and Portugal.

Over two decades, Jehle won 132 caps for the Liechtenstein national team.

Club career
Jehle was born in Schaan as the youngest of three brothers, all of whom grew up playing football. At the age of 16 he had trials with English Premier League clubs Liverpool and Crystal Palace, and both offered him professional contracts but he turned them down to stay home and finish school. Subsequently, he got further offers from Bayer 04 Leverkusen of the Bundesliga and Juventus F.C. of Serie A, but turned those down as well.

Eventually, Jehle signed with Grasshopper Club Zürich because of its proximity to his hometown. He made his Swiss Super League debut against FC Basel in August 2000, coming on in the 95th minute to replace first choice Stefan Huber who was sent off for giving away a penalty, and saved the ensuing spot kick taken by Massimo Ceccaroni. He deputised in goal the next game, and kept a clean sheet in a 4–0 win. Towards the end of the season, he again became the starter as Huber was out injured; he appeared in the 4–0 away victory over FC St. Gallen, the opposition's first home loss in 34 matches and confirmation of his team's championship win.

Jehle moved to Boavista F.C. during the summer of 2006, gaining first-choice status during his second season. In June 2008, after the Porto team's relegation from the Portuguese Primeira Liga due to the Apito Dourado affair, he left and signed a one-year contract with Tours FC from Ligue 2.

After just one season in France, Jehle returned to his country and joined FC Vaduz in the Swiss Challenge League. On 20 April 2018, the 36-year-old announced his retirement at the end of the campaign, following which he would work with the Liechtenstein Football Association in directorial capacities.

International career
Jehle made his debut for Liechtenstein on 14 October 1998, in a 2–1 win over Azerbaijan for the UEFA Euro 2000 qualifiers which was the country's first ever competitive victory. He was just 16 at the time, but quickly became first choice for the national team and remained in goal the following decade.

On 22 March 2013, with the score at 1–1 against Latvia, the opposition was awarded a penalty. Aleksandrs Cauņa stepped up to convert it but Jehle saved the shot, thus earning the hosts one of just two points during the 2014 FIFA World Cup qualification.

Honours
Grasshopper
Swiss Super League: 2000–01, 2002–03

Vaduz
Swiss Challenge League: 2013–14
Liechtenstein Football Cup: 2009–10, 2010–11, 2012–13, 2013–14, 2014–15, 2015–16, 2016–17

Individual
Liechtensteiner Footballer of the Year: 2014, 2016

See also
List of men's footballers with 100 or more international caps

References

Connelly, Charlie (2002) Stamping Grounds: Exploring Liechtenstein and Its World Cup Dreams. Abacus.

External links

Football.ch profile 

1982 births
Living people
Liechtenstein footballers
Association football goalkeepers
Swiss Super League players
Swiss Challenge League players
FC Schaan players
Grasshopper Club Zürich players
FC Vaduz players
FC Luzern players
Primeira Liga players
Boavista F.C. players
Ligue 2 players
Tours FC players
Liechtenstein international footballers
Liechtenstein expatriate footballers
Expatriate footballers in Switzerland
Expatriate footballers in Portugal
Expatriate footballers in France
Liechtenstein expatriate sportspeople in Switzerland
Liechtenstein expatriate sportspeople in Portugal
FIFA Century Club